Richard Bingley was an Irish soldier originally from Wales. In 1610 Bingley was appointed Constable of Doe Castle. He was granted a significant estate as part of the Plantation of Ulster. Along with his elder brother Sir Ralph Bingley, he turned County Donegal into a centre of Welsh settlement.

References

Bibliography
 
 

17th-century Irish people
Irish soldiers
People from County Donegal
People from Hawarden
Welsh emigrants to Ireland